Bharaj is a village situated near Mangowal Sharqi in the district of Gujrat, Pakistan. It's an old village and is inhabited by Gujjar Cast. It has an ancient grave of "Baba Naala ( Nihal Chand)" who is believed to be the elder of all the Gujjars settled in the Gujrat District. And in Gujarat there is also another village named Bharaj.

References

Villages in Gujrat District